Kidwelly Town Council (Welsh: Cyngor Tref Cydweli) is the town council serving the town of Kidwelly and the village of Mynydd-y-Garreg in the county of Carmarthenshire, Wales.

Background
Kidwelly Town Council consists of 16 Councillors. The council appoints a Mayor, known as the Mayor of Kidwelly and Mynydd Y Garreg, and takes care of local issues, such as Kidwelly Quay, the Town Cemetery, Christmas Lighting,  the Church Clock, Glan yr Afon Nature reserve, the War Memorial and Remembrance Garden. It also manages a large estate and promotes local tourism.

The town council is taking over responsibility of the playgrounds from Carmarthenshire County Council, under an asset transfer scheme.  Alongside taking over the running of the public conveniences in the town.

2015 was the 900th celebration of the establishment of the town of Kidwelly.

The council offices are to be found to the rear of the Princess Gwenllian Centre on Hillfield Villas, Kidwelly.  New purpose-built council offices and Council Chamber were opened May 2018.

Council composition
The May 2017 election was uncontested, because fewer nominations being made than the number of places available. It left the town council with the option of co-opting additional members.

In the news
Kidwelly Town Council made the UK news in 2015 when charges were dropped against a former deputy mayor, who had been accused of groping a woman during the 2014 mayoral ceremony. He made a full apology for his drunken behaviour and had resigned from the council after his arrest.

References

External links
Kidwelly Town Council

Local government in Carmarthenshire
Community councils of Wales
Town Council